David H. D. Warren is a computer scientist who worked primarily on logic programming and in particular the programming language Prolog in the 1970s and 1980s. Warren wrote the first compiler for Prolog, and the Warren Abstract Machine execution environment for Prolog is named after him.

Early life and education
Warren received a Ph.D. in artificial intelligence from the University of Edinburgh in 1977 under advisor Robert Kowalski, and (a second advisor) Donald Michie.

Career
Warren worked for the Artificial Intelligence Center at SRI International in the 1980s.

He founded the company Quintus Computer Systems in 1983 with William Kornfeld, Lawrence Byrd, Fernando Pereira and Cuthbert Hurd to commercialize the Prolog compiler. Quintus was sold to Intergraph Corporation in 1989.

He has also held an academic position at the University of Bristol Department of Computer Science.

References

Living people
Alumni of the University of Edinburgh
British computer scientists
SRI International people
Artificial intelligence researchers
Academics of the University of Bristol
Year of birth missing (living people)